"Girls & Boys" is the third single taken from American rock band Good Charlotte's second studio album, The Young and the Hopeless (2002). The song was released in Europe on April 28, 2003, and was issued in the United States and Australia later in the year. "Girls & Boys" peaked at number 48 on the US Billboard Hot 100 and peaked at number six in the United Kingdom, receiving a silver certification from the British Phonographic Industry (BPI) in 2018 for sales and streams exceeding 200,000 units. Elsewhere, the single reached the top 40 in Australia, Ireland, and New Zealand.

Music video
The music video for the song predominantly shows geriatric people dressed and acting like young people. The various members of the band are shown interacting with the older characters (for example playing video games and giving massages). At the end of the video, Benji Madden wakes up to find an old woman wearing one of his shirts and offering him a bowl of cereal.

The video for "Girls & Boys" was shot in the suburb of  Ellerslie in Auckland, New Zealand.  The longer version includes dialogue of a senior woman and the band, a parodying reference to Avril Lavigne's video "Complicated".

Track listings

UK CD1
 "Girls & Boys" – 3:01
 "Riot Girl" (acoustic) – 2:22
 "Girls & Boys" (video) – 3:01

UK CD2
 "Girls & Boys"
 "Lifestyles of the Rich and Famous" (live acoustic)
 "The Young and the Hopeless" (acoustic)

European CD single
 "Girls & Boys"
 "Riot Girl" (acoustic version)

Australian CD single
 "Girls & Boys"
 "If You Leave"
 "The Motivation Proclamation" (recorded live at Channel V)
 "Complicated"

Charts

Weekly charts

Year-end charts

Certifications

Release history

References

External links
 Good Charlotte video star still rocking at 90 by TVNZ

2002 songs
2003 singles
Daylight Records singles
Epic Records singles
Good Charlotte songs
Song recordings produced by Eric Valentine
Songs written by Benji Madden
Songs written by Joel Madden